The  is one of the major museums in Japan.  It is Japan's largest research institute in the academic disciplines of humanities and social sciences, which was established in 1974 and opened to the public in 1977. It is built on the former grounds of Expo '70 in Suita, Osaka. The founding collection is known as the Attic Collection, and is an early 20th-century ethnological collection of mainly Japanese materials, including some early finds of Jōmon archaeological artifacts (in the Morse Collection). Further collections were brought together for the opening in 1977 and collecting activities have continued since. 

The main focus of collection has been film, still images, sound recordings, and objects representing diverse aspects of everyday life, from farming to food, urban life, folk crafts, and religion. Permanent galleries for all large regions of the world display only part of the full collection.

Two special exhibitions of approximately three months duration are presented in Spring and Autumn each year, and there are numerous smaller temporary exhibitions on special themes. 

The museum has a staff of approximately 70 researchers, and actively supports visits by scholars around Japan and abroad. The museum library is one of the largest academic, multiple-language reference libraries in Japan, with books and journal in Japanese, English, Chinese, Spanish, and other languages. The library is linked to a national network of public university libraries.

The Museum offers PhD courses in association with Japan's Inter-University of Advanced Graduate Studies (Sōkendai), an inter-institutional organization that provides administration for students placed in public research institutes and laboratories all over Japan.

The National Museum of Ethnology is also a founding member of the National Institutes for Humanities (NIHU), Japan.

References

External links

 National Museum of Ethnology website

National museums of Japan
Ethnographic museums in Asia
Museums in Osaka Prefecture
Archaeological museums in Japan
Suita
Museums established in 1977
1977 establishments in Japan